A Sunshiny Day with Charley Pride is the fourteenth studio album by the American country music artist of the same name. It was released in 1972 on the RCA Victor label (catalog no. LSP-4742).

The album debuted on Billboard magazine's country album chart on August 19, 1972, spent 10 weeks at the No. 1 spot, and remained on the chart for a total of 28 weeks. The album also included the No. 1 hit single "It's Gonna Take a Little Bit Longer".

It was awarded two stars from AllMusic.

Track listing

Charts

Weekly charts

Year-end charts

References

1972 albums
Charley Pride albums
RCA Records albums